The following is a list of border conflicts between two or more countries. The list includes only those fought because of border disputes. See list of territorial disputes for those that do not involve fighting.

19th century

20th century before World War II

1945–2000

21st century

See also 
 List of territorial disputes
 List of national border changes from 1815 to 1914
 List of national border changes (1914–present)

References 

Border conflicts
Borders